Waitara railway station is located on the North Shore line, serving the Sydney suburb of Waitara. It is served by Sydney Trains T1 North Shore line services.

History

Waitara station opened on 20 April 1895. The original station was replaced by the present structure in 1909 when the line was duplicated.

Platforms and services

Transport links
Transdev NSW operates one route via Waitara station:
587:  Hornsby station to Westleigh

Waitara station is served by one NightRide route:
N90: Hornsby station to Town Hall station

References

External links

Waitara station details Transport for New South Wales

Railway stations in Sydney
Railway stations in Australia opened in 1895
North Shore railway line